Villa Cañás is a small city in the south of the , some 370 km from the provincial capital and not far from Venado Tuerto.

The city was founded in 1902 by Juan Cañás, and acknowledged as a comuna (a minor municipality) on 1903-03-07.

People
Legrand sisters - film star twin actresses and TV personalities
José A. Martínez Suárez, film director

References

In Spanish.
 
 
 La Página de Villa Cañás - Portal of the city.

Populated places in Santa Fe Province
Cities in Argentina
Santa Fe Province
Argentina